Patrick Moote (born August 17, 1983)  is an American actor, screenwriter, and documentarian. Moote is perhaps best known for his documentary UnHung Hero, in which he explores the topic of penis size and enlargement techniques around the world as a result of his own challenging experiences. Moote was hailed as an "affable hero" in the film, which was called "a lighthearted romp with laughs" by The Huffington Post and "laugh-out-loud funny" by the Los Angeles Times, also garnering praise from Michael Moore. As an actor, he has appeared on television shows such as How I Met Your Mother and Greek.

UnHung Hero

When Moote's former girlfriend publicly rejected his marriage proposal on the jumbotron at a UCLA basketball game, the video quickly went viral. After she privately revealed to Moote that her reason for being unable to marry him was because his penis size left something to be desired, he began exploring the issue on camera, traveling around the world and confronting ex-girlfriends, doctors, anthropologists and adult film stars to find out whether penis size actually matters.

The film premiered at South by Southwest in 2013 and is  available on demand on Showtime. and on Netflix.

Health 
On May 20, 2018, Moote was diagnosed with colon cancer, so he opened a GoFundMe account to help pay for his treatment.

Filmography

References

External links
 

21st-century American male actors
American male film actors
American male television actors
American male voice actors
Living people
1983 births